"Liquid" is a power ballad by the Finnish rock band The Rasmus, originally released on the band's third album Hell of a Tester on 2 November 1998.

The single was released in 1998 by the record label Warner Music Finland. The single (which was the first one from the album Hell of a Tester) features only the track "Liquid". "Liquid" is a slow and melodic song, maybe one of the band's slowest songs ever.

It reached number two on the Finland singles chart and made it in the Top 40 on MTV Nordic. It was voted Single of the Year for 1998 by music critics and fans.

Single track listing
 "Liquid" – 4:17

Music video
"Liquid" is the only song from the album that got released as a music video. It was directed by Viljami Eronen and won an honorable mention at the 1999 Oulu Music Video Festival. The video shows a dark place, sometimes with stars in the background. The band play their instruments and there is also a young woman there, wearing a black dress. Traditional children's toys are featured, including a hoop, skipping rope, ball and scooter. Bassist Eero Heinonen appears to be wearing pyjamas and is seen switching off a lamp. During the instrumental interlude in the song, the woman is seen swimming upwards towards the light. The cheerful, uplifting tone of the song is emphasised by the video, as the band members are playing like children and some of them are seen spinning on their chairs.

Personnel
 Lauri Ylönen – vocals
 Pauli Rantasalmi – guitar
 Eero Heinonen – bass
 Janne Heiskanen – drums
 Riku Niemi – strings

References

External links
 The Rasmus' official website
 Lyrics
 "Liquid" music video on YouTube

The Rasmus songs
1998 singles
Warner Music Group singles
Songs written by Lauri Ylönen
1998 songs